The European College of Sport Science (ECSS) is a sport scientific society founded in 1995 in Nice, France, dedicated to the collection, generation and dissemination of scientific knowledge. The spirit of this non-profit organisation is to Share your knowledge.

Objective & Purpose
The ECSS is the leading association of sport scientists at the European level and practices extensive co operations with corresponding non-European associations.
The purpose of the College is the promotion of science and research, with special attention to sport science across Europe and beyond. 
Its topics include the motivation, attitudes, values and responses, adaptation, performance and health aspects of people engaged in physical activity and the relation of physical activity and lifestyle to health, prevention and aging. These topics are dealt with on an interdisciplinary basis.

Function
The ECSS is a non-profit organization. It supports European institutions, such as the European Union (EU) and the Council of Europe, by offering scientific advice and assistance for coordinated European and worldwide research projects defined by these bodies. 
Additionally it serves as the most important European network of sport scientists from all relevant sub disciplines.

Membership
The ECSS offers individual membership to sport and related scientists. The objective is to create a scientific European and worldwide network for scientific exchange and interaction. This is strengthened by the annual Congresses and other membership benefits such as the European Journal of Sport Science (EJSS), the ECSS News Bulletin, Email Newsletters, etc.
The qualification for the ECSS membership students is a university level degree (master’s or doctor’s degree, university examination) in the field of sport science, or an equivalent university degree in other related areas.
Members comprise scientists from all areas of sport science such as Physiology, Sports Medicine, Psychology, Molecular Biology, Sociology, Biochemistry, Motor Control, Biomechanics, Training Science and many more. 
The ECSS experiences a constant growth membership.

Annual Congresses
The main scientific event of the ECSS is the annual congress. Annual congresses have been organized since the inauguration of the ECSS in 1995. Today the ECSS congresses rank among the leading sport scientific congresses worldwide. The congress comprises a range of invited lecturers, multi- and mono-disciplinary symposia as well as tutorial lecturers and Socratic debates. The ECSS congress is attended by international sport scientists with an academic career. The ECSS congresses now welcome up to 3000 participants from all over the world.

ECSS Office
The ECSS Office is located in Cologne, Germany.

Former Presidents 
Based on a rotation principle, the European College of Sport Science had the following presidents:

2015-2017, Prof. Tim Cable, Aspire Academy
2013-2015, Prof. Marco Narici, University of Nottingham
2011-2013, Prof. Sigmund Loland, Norwegian School of Sport Sciences
2009-2011, Prof. Hans Hoppeler, University of Bern
2007-2009, Prof. Albert Gollhofer, University of Freiburg
2005-2007, Prof. Erich Müller, University of Salzburg
2003-2005, Prof. Michael Kjaer, Bispeepjerg Hospital
2001-2003, Prof. Paolo Parisi, IUSM Rome
1999-2001, Prof. Joachim Mester, German Sport University Cologne
1997-1999, Prof. Paavo V. Komi, University of Jyväskylä
1995-1997, Prof. Bengt Saltin, University of Copenhagen

External links
ECSS Website
ECSS Congress Website

References

European sports federations
Sports science
Sport in Cologne
Education in Cologne
Organisations based in Cologne